The 1987–88 Utah State Aggies men's basketball team represented Utah State University as a member of the Pacific Coast Athletic Association during the 1987–88 men's college basketball season. After winning the PCAA tournament, the Aggies received an automatic bid to the NCAA tournament where they lost in the first round to Vanderbilt.

Roster

Schedule and results

|-
!colspan=12 style=| Regular season

|-
!colspan=12 style=|PCAA tournament

|-
!colspan=12 style=|NCAA Tournament

Notes

References 

Utah State Aggies men's basketball seasons
Utah State Aggies men's basketball
Utah State Aggies men's basketball
Utah State
Utah State